Meconopsis simplicifolia is a perennial in the poppy family, sometimes monocarpic, with a taproot,  rosette of leaves with bristly hairs, and blue or purple flowers on leafless stems, native to altitudes of  in central Nepal and southeastern Tibet.

References

External links

simplicifolia